Blanco Creek is a  long fifth-order tributary to the Frio River in Uvalde County, Texas.

Variant names
According to the Geographic Names Information System, it has also been known historically as:
Big Blanco Creek
Blanco River

Course
Blanco Creek rises about 5 miles southwest of Utopia, Texas in Uvalde County, Texas and then flows south-southeast to join the Frio River about 20 miles southwest of Uvalde, Texas.

Watershed
Blanco Creek drains  of area, receives about 28.7 in/year of precipitation, and is about 13.18% forested.

See also
List of rivers of Texas

References

USGS Geographic Names Information Service
USGS Hydrologic Unit Map - State of Texas (1974)

Rivers of Texas